The VL-3 Evolution also called the Aveko VL-3 Sprint is a Czech ultralight aircraft, designed and initially produced by Aveko of Brno. The design is now produced by JMB Aircraft of Choceň. The aircraft was originally supplied by Aveko complete ready-to-fly, but is now owner-completed through a factory assistance program.

Design and development
The aircraft was designed to comply with the Fédération Aéronautique Internationale microlight rules. It features a cantilever low-wing a two-seats-in-side-by-side configuration enclosed cockpit, fixed or retractable tricycle landing gear and a single engine in tractor configuration.

The aircraft is made from composites. The standard engine is the  Rotax 912ULS four-stroke powerplant.

A fixed gear version with a larger wing span and area as well as a higher gross weight was developed for the US light-sport aircraft category and was marketed from about 2009 to 2016 by Gobosh Aviation as the Gobosh 800XP. By 2016 the Gobosh Aviation company website had been taken down and the company had likely gone out of business.

Operational history

Variants

VL-3 FG
Fixed landing gear model
VL-3 RG
Retractable landing gear model
VL-3C-1
Model with fixed landing gear and a slower wing and  take-off weight for the light-sport aircraft category.

Specifications (VL-3 Sprint)

References

External links

2000s Czech ultralight aircraft
Single-engined tractor aircraft